The Bishopric of Metz was a prince-bishopric of the Holy Roman Empire. It was one of the Three Bishoprics that were annexed by France in 1552. The Bishops of Metz had already ruled over a significant amount of territories within the former Kingdom of Lotharingia, which by the 870 Treaty of Meerssen became a part of East Francia. They had to struggle for their independence from the Dukes of Lorraine, acquired the lands of the Counts of Metz, but had to face the rise of their capital Metz to the status of an Imperial City in 1189. In 1234 the unrest of the Metz citizens forced the bishops to move their residence to Vic-sur-Seille.

In 1357 Emperor Charles IV of Luxembourg again confirmed the bishopric's Imperial immediacy. From the accession of Henri of Lorraine-Vaudémont in 1484 however, the diocese was ruled by bishops from the House of Lorraine, who by their close relations with the House of Valois brought Metz unter the influence of the French crown. By the 1552 Treaty of Chambord, an alliance of revolting Protestant Imperial princes led by Elector Maurice of Saxony promised the overlordship over the Three Bishoprics of Metz, Toul and Verdun to King Henry II of France. Metz was occupied by Henry's troops and annexed by the French crown, finally acknowledged by the Empire in the 1648 Peace of Westphalia.

See also
Roman Catholic Diocese of Metz
List of Bishops of Metz

References

Prince-bishoprics of the Holy Roman Empire in France
Metz